Capitol Peak may refer to: